The 76th Indianapolis 500 was held at the Indianapolis Motor Speedway in Speedway, Indiana, on Sunday, May 24, 1992. The race is famous for the fierce battle in the closing laps, as race winner Al Unser Jr. held off second place Scott Goodyear for the victory by 0.043 seconds, the closest finish in Indy history. Unser Jr. became the first second-generation driver to win the Indy 500, following in the footsteps of his father Al Unser Sr. He also became the third member of the famous Unser family to win the race.

Cold temperatures and high winds turned the race into a crash-filled, marathon day. The tone for the race was set early when pole position winner Roberto Guerrero spun out and crashed on the parade lap. The race was dominated by Michael Andretti in the debut of the Ford Cosworth XB engine. Andretti led 160 laps and was 30 seconds in front when his fuel pump suddenly failed with eleven laps to go.

Thirteen cars were eliminated in crashes during the race, and several other serious wrecks occurred during practice. Former Formula One World Champion Nelson Piquet suffered serious leg injuries in a crash on May 7. Pancho Carter and Hiro Matsushita suffered broken bones in separate crashes, and rookie Jovy Marcelo was fatally injured after a practice crash on May 15. Defending winner Rick Mears crashed during practice and during the race, while Jeff Andretti experienced the worst crash during the race itself, suffering serious injuries to his legs and feet.

Following the race, sweeping changes came about at the track, largely in the interest of safety. In addition, a noticeable "changing of the guard" followed, as the 1992 race signaled the final race for several Indy legends, including A. J. Foyt, Rick Mears, Tom Sneva, and Gordon Johncock. A race-record ten former winners started in the field.

The race was sanctioned by USAC, and was included as part of the 1992 PPG Indy Car World Series. Unser's victory was considered by some an "upset," as his somewhat inauspicious Galmer chassis was not expected to excel on ovals, and its first generation Chevy engine was starting to become a lame duck powerplant in the series. It was also a long-awaited victory for Unser, who was making his tenth Indy attempt. Unser, the 1990 CART champion, had recently confided with Paul Page that he was afraid he may never win the 500.

Offseason
A busy offseason began at the conclusion of the 1991 PPG Indy Car World Series. The biggest announcement was the return of Ford to the Indy car ranks. The Ford Cosworth XB was introduced to replace the aging DFX and the lesser-used DFS. It quickly became an engine of choice, and for 1992, was the powerplant for Newman/Haas Racing and Chip Ganassi Racing. For 1992, Ilmor introduced an updated motor (the 265-B), badged as the "Chevrolet-B", and it was fielded by Penske Racing singly. The rest of the Chevrolet teams utilized the existing Ilmor (265-A), now being referred to as the "Chevy-A".

Galles-Kraco Racing unveiled their new Galmer chassis for 1992. It met with instant success as Al Unser Jr. won the pole position for the season opener at Surfers Paradise and finished 4th. Teammate Danny Sullivan won a few weeks later at Long Beach, with Unser Jr. 4th. The chassis was expected to excel on street and road courses, but there were some doubts about its oval track abilities. Unser Jr. managed a 4th place at Phoenix, but both drivers entered the month of May at Indy with mixed expectations.

Truesports fielded their own in-house "All American" chassis for the second year in a row, this time designated the Truesports 92C, and powered by the Chevy Ilmor-A. Previously Truesports had been utilizing the Judd AV engine.

After much fanfare of a pending retirement in 1991, A. J. Foyt brushed off the idea, and returned to the cockpit. He raced in the 1992 Daytona 500, and entered as a driver for Indianapolis. It would be his record 35th consecutive Indy 500 start. A crash earlier in the season at Phoenix left him with a fractured shoulder, but it would be only a minor setback.

Team and driver switches for 1992 included most notably Bobby Rahal and Danny Sullivan, who essentially swapped rides with each other at Galles-Kraco Racing and Patrick Racing, respectively. In December, however, Pat Patrick sold the assets of Patrick Racing to Rahal and his partner Carl Hogan. The team became known as Rahal-Hogan Racing. Right off the bat, Rahal scored a victory for the re-booted team. He won the second race of the season at Phoenix, leading wire-to-wire.

Rookie driver Paul Tracy continued into his second year with Penske, and was offered his first attempt at Indy with the team.

Testing
During testing in March and April, King Racing set the early pace. On March 28, Roberto Guerrero became the first driver to run a test lap over 230 mph. Teammate Jim Crawford also ran a 230 mph lap. The Indy car testing was accompanied by a concurrent IROC feasibility test. Track management was at the time exploring the possibility of holding a stock car or IROC event at the circuit.

Goodyear arrived at the Speedway sporting a slightly new look. The logos on the tires were painted in yellow. This coincided with a change in signage for Goodyear in American auto racing, as the company brought back their classic blue and yellow logo scheme for motorsports.

Rule changes
For 1992, new pit rules were implemented by USAC. At the onset of a caution flag, the pit road was immediately closed, and cars were required to pack up behind the pace car first. The next time around, if officials deemed the field was properly bunched up, the pits would open for all competitors. In addition, a 100 mph speed limit was applied to the pits during caution periods. These rules reflected regulations that NASCAR had experimented with in 1991, and were in the interest of safety for drivers and crew members.

Race schedule

Practice – week 1

Saturday May 2
King Racing teammates Jim Crawford and Roberto Guerrero quickly established themselves as the cars to beat during the first week of practice. The two drivers fielded a pair of Lola V-6 Buicks, an engine that many thought was finally beginning to show its potential after years of development. On opening day, Crawford broke the unofficial track record with a lap of 229.609 mph. Several rookies finished their rookie tests, including Paul Tracy, Jimmy Vasser, Lyn St. James, and the most noteworthy of the rookies, former Formula One world champion Nelson Piquet.

Sunday May 3
Fabrizio Barbazza crashed in turn 1 midway through the day during a refresher test. He was not injured. Late in the day, Al Unser Jr., driving the new Galmer chassis, blew a motor. Michael Andretti led the speed chart for the afternoon at 226.187 mph.

Monday May 4
Roberto Guerrero upped the speed for the month, becoming the first driver to practice over 230 mph at the Speedway. His lap of 230.432 mph early in the session, however, lasted only a couple hours. Teammate Jim Crawford upped the speed, and by the end of the day, posted a 233.433 mph lap. Meanwhile, Nelson Piquet was comfortably getting up to speed, running a top lap of 226.809 mph.

Tuesday May 5
Several incidents occurred on Tuesday, during a cool, windy day. Scott Brayton, Buddy Lazier, and Paul Tracy each suffered separate spins/crashes. Rookie Lyn St. James was finding speed difficult, running a 217.097 mph, her fastest lap of the month, nowhere near the top of the charts. Guerrero continued King Racing's dominance, turning in another 230 mph practice lap.

Wednesday May 6
Crawford and Guerrero led the speed chart once again, with Crawford over 233 mph for the second time. The biggest story of the day, however, was the massive crash by Rick Mears. Late in the afternoon, Mears entered turn two, and a fluid leak sprayed water over the back wheels. The car broke out into a spin, and he crashed hard into the wall in turn two. The car flipped over and remained upside down while sliding down the backstretch. Mears suffered a minor foot fracture and an injury to his wrist.

Thursday May 7
The second major crash in two days occurred, this time involving Nelson Piquet. In turn four, Piquet's car did a reverse spin, and hit the wall head-on with the nose. Piquet suffered serious injuries to both legs, and was immediately admitted to the hospital for surgery. Piquet withdrew and would require nearly a year of rehabilitation. Piquet had been acclimating himself quite well to the Speedway, but was reportedly frustrated with the frequency of caution lights during the practice sessions. A metal piece of debris was reported on the backstretch, prompting USAC to turn on the yellow. Piquet, in the middle of a "hot lap", momentarily ignored the yellow light, and raced through turn three and the north chute. In turn four, he lifted off the throttle quickly to enter the pits, at which time the car snapped out of control.

Roberto Guerrero was back at the top of the speed chart, running his fastest lap of the month, 232.624 mph.

Friday May 8
The final day of practice before the run for the pole position saw four drivers over 231 mph. Mario Andretti led the chart for the day, at 233.202 mph. Arie Luyendyk was second, while Crawford and Guerrero were close behind. Al Unser, Sr. was named as a replacement for Nelson Piquet's entry, and Gary Bettenhausen suffered damage when his engine blew, causing a lazy spin in turn 1.

Time trials – weekend 1

Pole Day – Saturday May 9
Rain kept the cars off the track until noon, and persistent "weepers" plagued the rest of the afternoon. During the first practice session, Jim Crawford's hopes for a pole position were set back when he blew an engine and spun.

Several yellows for moisture and debris dragged out the 60-minute practice session until 3:15 p.m. Roberto Guerrero (232.090 mph) set the fastest practice lap of the day.

Qualifying finally began at 4 p.m. Arie Luyendyk was the first car out, and he did not disappoint. He set a new one-lap track record of 229.305 mph, and grabbed the provisional pole position with a four-lap record of 229.127 mph. A hectic round of time trials followed, as drivers scrambled for their shot at qualifying before the 6 p.m. gun. At 4:50 p.m., Gary Bettenhausen set a one-lap record of 229.317 mph, but his four-lap record was shy of the pole. Among the other drivers securing a starting position were Bobby Rahal, Emerson Fittipaldi, Paul Tracy, and Al Unser Jr. Scott Goodyear also put a Walker Racing team car in the field, taking a run of 219.054 mph.

At 5:34 p.m., Roberto Guerrero took to the track. He set new all-time one- and four lap track records on his way to the pole position.
Lap 1 – 38.762 seconds, 232.186 mph (new 1-lap track record)
Lap 2 – 38.707 seconds, 232.516 mph (new 1-lap track record)
Lap 3 – 38.690 seconds, 232.618 mph (new 1-lap track record)
Lap 4 – 38.692 seconds, 232.606 mph
Total – 2:34.851, 232.482 mph (new 4-lap track record)
Following the run, Guerrero ran out of fuel, and stalled on the backstretch. The next car out to qualify was Danny Sullivan, who had already left the pits. The resulting yellow light condition halted qualifying for several minutes, and precipitated Sullivan to pull off the track and get back in line to qualify later.

After Guerrero was towed back to the pits, Rick Mears took to the track, shaking off his accident earlier in the week. Mario Andretti squeezed himself onto the front row, with one lap over 230 mph. A. J. Foyt was the final car of the day. After three laps in the 226 mph range, the engine quit on the final lap, and Foyt aborted the run.

Since the original qualifying order had not yet exhausted before the 6 p.m. close, pole qualifying was to be extended into the next day. Among the cars still in line were Jim Crawford, Michael Andretti, Eddie Cheever, and Danny Sullivan, who could not get back in line in enough time after refueling.

Second Day – Sunday May 10
With a handful of cars still eligible for the pole, Roberto Guerrero was forced to wait through the night to see if his pole run would hold up. Teammate Jim Crawford was still considered a threat, but another engine failure in the morning practice set the team back. Eddie Cheever bumped his way into the front row with a 229.639 mph run. Michael Andretti qualified for the second row.

Crawford's crew, scrambling to install a new motor, wheeled the car out to the pits yet unfinished, with parts in hand. Two crew members were actually sitting in the engine bay, working on it, as others pushed it towards the qualifying line. They were unable to finish the engine work in time, and Crawford missed out on his chance for the pole position. Moments later Roberto Guerrero was officially awarded the $100,000 PPG pole award.

Late in the day, the field filled to 27 cars. Al Unser, Sr., A. J. Foyt and Raul Boesel all made runs. Crawford finally put his car in the field, but despite the 228.859 mph average (6th fastest overall), his status as a second day qualifier forced him to line up 21st.

Practice – week 2

Monday May 11
A light day of activity saw Jeff Wood and Jovy Marcelo the fastest among non-qualified cars. Scott Pruett did a light spin, but made no contact.

Tuesday May 12
Rain closed the track early at 2:25 p.m. Jovy Marcelo was the fastest among non-qualified cars, at 216.534 mph.

Wednesday May 13
Increased activity was seen at the track. Lyn St. James was still struggling in the 212 mph range in her Cosworth. St. James' contract for Ford Motor Company had prevented her from driving the more powerful Chevrolet so far during the month.

Thursday May 14
Ted Prappas led the non-qualified cars at 221.212 mph. Dick Simon Racing announced that an agreement had been made for Lyn St. James to utilize Philippe Gache's back up car, a Lola/Chevrolet. St. James was quickly over 218 mph.

Friday May 15 – Fatal crash of Jovy Marcelo
At 4:07 p.m., rookie Jovy Marcelo went low in turn one, and spun into the outside wall. The car slid along the wall, then came to rest in turn two. His car suffered major front end damage, and Marcelo was found unconscious. At 4:35 p.m., Marcelo was pronounced dead at Methodist Hospital of a basal skull fracture. It was the first driver fatality at the Indianapolis Motor Speedway since the fatal accident of Gordon Smiley exactly ten years earlier on May 15, 1982.

The final full day of practice, meanwhile, saw Tony Bettenhausen Jr. run the fastest lap of the week for non-qualified cars, 221.033 mph. Didier Theys was second at 220.146 mph in a John Andretti back-up car.

Time trials – weekend 2

Third Day – Saturday May 16
The third day of time trials saw three cars added to the field. Tom Sneva joined as a third driver for Menard Racing, and Pancho Carter's month came to an end when he broke his arm in a turn 2 crash.

Lyn St. James ran her fastest laps of the month and became the second female driver to qualify for the Indianapolis 500. Her third lap of 220.902 mph was also a closed-course record for a female racing driver. She also became the oldest rookie driver in the history of the race, at age 45. Brian Bonner and Mike Groff (a teammate to Scott Goodyear) also completed runs, filling the field to 30 cars. Tom Sneva and Gordon Johncock were among those who waved off attempts.

Bump Day – Sunday May 17
The final day of qualifying saw heavy track action. Several cars went out early on to qualify, but only Kenji Momota and Dominic Dobson finished their runs. At 2:45 p.m., in his third and final attempt, Tom Sneva put his car safely in the field at 219.737 mph. At that point, the field was filled, with Jimmy Vasser (218.268 mph) on the bubble.

At 3:50 p.m., Gordon Johncock bumped Vasser, which put Kenji Momota on the bubble. Vasser turned right around and re-qualified in a back-up car. Vasser's speed of 222.313 mph established him as the fastest rookie qualifier. The move put Scott Goodyear (219.054 mph) on the bubble.

In the final hour, after showing promise during practice, Didier Theys' third and final qualifying attempt ended with a blown engine. Likewise Tony Bettenhausen could not get up to speed and waved off. With six minutes left until the 6 o'clock gun, Ted Prappas took to the track. He bumped Scott Goodyear out by 0.089 seconds. Johnny Rutherford made one last futile attempt to qualify, but was too slow to bump his way in.

Carburetion Day – Thursday May 21
The final practice session saw Mario Andretti (226.409 mph) as the fastest car of the day. Ford Cosworth XB teams swept the top four spots. Pole-sitter Roberto Guerrero was fifth fastest, and Bobby Rahal was the fastest of the Chevrolet powered machines. Al Unser Jr. practiced a disappointing 25th speed rank. There were eight cautions during the two-hour session, but none for accidents.

Rahal-Hogan Racing with driver Bobby Rahal and chief mechanic Jim Prescott won the Miller Pit Stop contest.

During the week leading up to the race, Walker Racing announced that Scott Goodyear would replace Mike Groff in the team's qualified car. Goodyear, the team's primary driver, was bumped on the final day of time trials. The switch required the #15 car to be moved to the rear of the field, and Goodyear would start 33rd on race day.

Starting grid

 Guerrero crashed during the second parade lap, and did not start the race. Gache also spun on the parade lap, and drove to the pits and missed the start. He joined the field on lap 3.
 Scott Goodyear and Mike Groff were teammates for Walker Racing. Goodyear was the full-time primary driver (entered in a 1992 chassis), and Groff the second team driver (entered in a 1991 chassis). Due to a lingering oil pressure problem, and the hectic nature of the abbreviated pole day time trials session, Goodyear and Groff temporarily swapped cars to qualify, in order to take advantage of the favorable draw. At the close of qualifying, the team pre-planned to swap the drivers back to their original cars, and Goodyear and Groff would move to the rear of the field. However, at the close of qualifying, Groff had qualified 26th, but Goodyear was bumped. As expected, and as planned, Goodyear took Groff's place behind the wheel in the primary car. The driver switch required the car to be moved to the rear of the field (33rd).

Alternates 
First alternate:  Mike Groff (#75/#17) – qualified 26th, but turned the car over to teammate Scott Goodyear

Failed to Qualify 
 Kenji Momota (R) (#88) – bumped
 Didier Theys (#38) – blew an engine during qualifying
 Tony Bettenhausen Jr. (#16/#61) – too slow
 Mark Dismore (#66/#93) – too slow
 Johnny Parsons (#30) – too slow
 Johnny Rutherford (W) (#17) – too slow
 Pancho Carter (#81) – crashed in practice; suffered broken arm
 Hiro Matsushita (#11) – crashed in practice; suffered broken leg
 Nelson Piquet (R) (#27) – crashed in practice; suffered serious leg injuries
 Jovy Marcelo (R) (#50) – crashed in practice; fatally injured
 Fabrizio Barbazza (#30/#42) – practiced, but did not make a qualifying attempt

Race recap

Pre-race

A cold front entered the Indianapolis area the evening before the race, bringing misty rain and cold temperatures. Mary F. Hulman gave the starting command at 10:51 a.m., and the pace car, driven by Bobby Unser led the field on the way to the first parade lap. John Paul Jr.'s car experienced engine issues on the grid, but at the last second, he hastily pulled away to join the field. The cold weather made for precarious conditions for the drivers, as it would be increasingly difficult to warm up the slick tires.

As the field entered the backstretch on the second parade lap, polesitter Roberto Guerrero gunned his machine to warm up the tires. The back end whipped around, and the car spun into the inside wall. The suspension was damaged enough that he could not continue, and he was out of the race before the green flag. Moments later, Philippe Gache lost control on cold tires, and spun lazily into the apron of turn 4. The incidents delayed the start by about five minutes.

Without the polesitter in the race, second place starter Eddie Cheever was charged with leading the field to the green flag.

First half
In turn one, outside runners Michael and Mario Andretti split Cheever on the inside and outside. Michael took the lead, with Mario behind him in 2nd. Michael Andretti blistered the track to set a new record for the first lap at 210.339 mph. After only four laps of green flag racing, however, Éric Bachelart blew an engine. Unable to return to the pits, Bachelart brought out the yellow. During this caution period, Mario Andretti made two pit stops to have identified (and replaced) a shorted ignition wire, and dropped one lap down.

The field went back to green on lap 11. In turn four, Tom Sneva lost control with cold tires, and crashed hard into the outside wall. A long caution followed to clean up the debris. On lap 21, the race finally got going, with Michael Andretti the early and dominating leader.

A fairly long stretch of green flag racing saw Michael Andretti starting to lap the field up through 12th place. Andretti was running race laps in the high 220 mph range. Andretti was being chased primarily by Arie Luyendyk, Scott Brayton and Eddie Cheever. By lap 60, Andretti held a 30-second lead, and only three cars were on the lead lap. The average speed at lap 60 had climbed to 161.458 mph

Multiple crashes

Michael Andretti's blistering pace was halted on lap 62 when Gordon Johncock blew an engine. The caution bunched the field for a restart on lap 67. Moments after the green, rookie Philippe Gache spun and hit the outside wall. The car slid into the path of Stan Fox, and Fox plowed into the wreck. The crash was blamed on cold tires, and Gache's inexperience, although both drivers emerged from the crash virtually unhurt.

The green came back out on lap 75. In turn one, Jim Crawford lost control while attempting to pass John Andretti, and collected Rick Mears. Both cars crashed hard into the outside wall and rested on the south chute. Behind the crash, Emerson Fittipaldi lost control and hit the outside wall in turn one as well. All three drivers were sent to Methodist Hospital for relatively minor injuries. Mears would miss the next race two weeks later in Detroit as a result of this crash.

On lap 84, the green came out once again, but as the field headed down the mainstretch, Mario Andretti crashed in turn four. The car lost the back end due to cold tires, and slammed nose-first hard into the wall. Andretti went to Methodist Hospital with broken toes. Like Mears, Mario would also miss the next race two weeks later in Detroit due to the crash.

The green came back out on lap 90, but the racing was brief as Scott Brayton blew an engine on lap 94. That caution was followed by another after Paul Tracy also blew an engine on lap 97, and Jimmy Vasser subsequently smacked the wall in turn one. The field went back to green on lap 103, but cold tires struck again, as rookie Brian Bonner lost control and crashed in turn 4.

The field safely restarted on lap 110. Five laps later, a major crash occurred. Jeff Andretti's car broke a right-rear wheel hub in turn two. The car snapped into a hard spin, and Jeff Andretti crashed head-on into the wall near the Turn Two Suites. The front of the car was demolished, and Andretti suffered severe leg injuries. Andretti's errant right-rear tire and wheel bounced off the outside retaining wall and flew high into the air and across the track. The wheel struck Gary Bettenhausen's left front suspension, sending him out of control into the inside wall at the start of the backstretch, eliminating him from the race as well. It took 18 minutes to extricate Jeff Andretti from the car, and he was immediately transported to Methodist Hospital for surgery. Meanwhile, Jeff's older brother Michael Andretti was still leading. Michael, however, had just seen both his father and brother crash and be sent to the hospital.

Just seconds before Jeff Andretti's crash, Bobby Rahal was forced to pit due to a flat tire. When the yellow came out for Andretti, Rahal lost a lap, and would be mired a lap down the rest of the way.

From lap 62–122, only nine laps of green flag racing were turned in. Eight cautions slowed the race for almost 90 minutes. The race finally got back underway at lap 123.

Second half
Michael Andretti took over where he had left off, and pulled away from the competition. The dwindling field was down to 17 cars, and only six were on the lead lap. Among the cars still in contention were Ganassi teammates Eddie Cheever and Arie Luyendyk. Al Unser Jr. and Al Unser Sr. had moved up into the top five, and Scott Goodyear had climbed from last starting position to 6th place (last car on the lead lap). A. J. Foyt had worked his way into the top ten, and by lap 135, Lyn St. James was the only rookie left running.

Around the halfway point of the race, the National Weather Service had issued a bulletin.

On lap 137, Arie Luyendyk attempted to lap A. J. Foyt, but Foyt had lost a mirror and did not see him. Luyendyk got into the "marbles," and slid up into the turn 4 wall. 

The green resumed on lap 144, with Al Unser Jr. in the lead after a sequence of pit stops. Michael Andretti charged towards the front, but Al Unser Sr. passed him for second momentarily. The dicing was halted when Buddy Lazier blew an engine and brought another yellow out.

With 50 laps to go, only 15 cars were running, and only five cars were on the lead lap.

Late race
With 45 laps to go, the green came out and the field began the race to the finish. Michael Andretti once again began to easily pull away from his competitors. On the 166th lap, he ran a record race lap of 229.118 mph, en route to a 15-second lead.

On laps 171–177, the field began circulating through a series of green-flag pit stops. It would be the final stops of the day. During the sequence, Al Sr. passed his son Al Jr. and led for four laps. After the field shuffled through their stops, Michael Andretti was back in the lead, by 23 seconds.

Finish

With 12 laps to go, Michael Andretti held a 28-second lead over Scott Goodyear. One lap later, Al Unser Jr. passed Goodyear for second place. On lap 189, Michael Andretti was pulling alongside Al Sr. to put him a lap down in turn two. Down the backstretch, however, Andretti suddenly began to slow. His fuel pump had failed, and the car coasted to a stop in the north short chute. Andretti had dominated nearly the entire race up to that point, and had led 160 of the first 189 laps.

Al Unser Jr. suddenly inherited the lead, with Scott Goodyear right behind him in second. The caution came out for Andretti's stalled car, and the field bunched up for a late-race restart.

With 7 laps to go, the green flag came out, and the race was down to a tense two-man battle between Al Unser Jr. and Scott Goodyear. With four laps to go, Unser held a 0.3-second lead. The cars battled nose-to-tail around the entire track, with the savvy Unser holding off Goodyear. On the final lap, Goodyear drafted Unser down the backstretch, and tucked closely behind through the final turn. In turn four, Unser got loose, and claimed he had to back off the throttle slightly, and Goodyear pounced on the opportunity to close in. Out of the final turn, Goodyear zig-zagged behind Unser down the straightaway. A few hundred yards from the finish line, Goodyear pulled alongside, attempting a slingshot pass. Unser held him off officially by 0.043 seconds, less than one car length, the closest finish in Indy 500 history.

Al Unser Sr. edged out Eddie Cheever by a split second for third place. A. J. Foyt brought his car home in 9th, while John Paul Jr., who nursed his car all day with a broken fuel cable, avoided all the crashes to finish 10th. Lyn St. James (11th place) clinched the rookie of the year award, as she was the only rookie left running. Danny Sullivan finished 5th, giving Galles/KRACO Racing two cars in the top five. It was Sullivan's first top ten since 1986. CART points leader Bobby Rahal also escaped the carnage, coming home 6th, and maintained his points lead.

It was the first of three bitter defeats in the Indy 500 for Scott Goodyear. Goodyear, an experienced road racer, was lauded by many for charging from last place (33rd) to nearly winning the race. It would have been the first time in Indy history that a driver won from the last starting position, and would have been Goodyear's first win in Indy car competition. Later in the year, he would triumph at the Michigan 500. In a post-race interview a disappointed but happy Goodyear said "This is a real disappointment. When Michael Andretti lost the lead those last few laps I thought 'This is a real possibility.' It was a two-car race from there. I just couldn't get enough time against him and he just beat me. We just drove flat-out those last 3 laps and my Mackenzie team did a fantastic job. We had an up-and-down month and they gave me such a good race-car. I just needed a little more time to get him."

In victory lane, a very emotional Al Unser Jr. climbed from the cockpit, and was interviewed by ABC-TV's Jack Arute. When Arute noticed some tears behind Unser, Jr's voice, Unser Jr. responded in what would become one of the most famous quotes regarding victory at the Indianapolis 500:

Unser's quote would be replayed in many subsequent airings, as well as during the intro for ABC's Wide World of Sports in reference to the famous catchphrase "The Thrill of Victory".

Box score

 – Former Indianapolis 500 winner,  – Rookie

*C Chassis: G=Galmer, L=Lola, P=Penske, T=TrueSports

*E Engine: B=Buick, C=Ilmor-Chevrolet, F=Cosworth-Ford

All cars utilized Goodyear tires.

Race statistics

Legacy
Scott Goodyear's charge from 33rd starting position to second place marked the second time a driver had done so in Indy history, Tom Sneva went from 33rd to 2nd in 1980. The winning margin of Unser over Goodyear was later deemed to be closer than published. Unser's Galmer-Chevrolet placed its timing transponder in the nose of the car rather than the sidepod, the standard location in all the other cars. Goodyear's Lola lagged behind due to its placement of the transponder in the sidepod. USAC officials estimated an unofficial winning margin of 0.0331 seconds.

The exciting finish of the 1992 Indy 500 was overshadowed by the vast number of serious crashes during the month, including the fatal crash of Jovy Marcelo and the devastating injures suffered by both Nelson Piquet and Jeff Andretti. The crash-filled race saw 13 cautions for 85 laps, and the slowest average speed since 1958. Several drivers spent time in the hospital, while others required lengthy rehabilitation. At the next Indy car race at Detroit, several drivers required substitute drivers, including Mario Andretti, Rick Mears, and Hiro Matsushita.

In the aftermath of his crashes during practice and the race, Rick Mears raced only a partial schedule for the remainder of the 1992 season. He dropped out of the Michigan 500 due to the nagging injured wrist he suffered in his practice crash and abruptly retired from driving in December. The 1992 race was also the final start for A. J. Foyt, who would retire from the cockpit before the 1993 race.

The Andretti Family's misfortunes during the race reflected back to the Andretti Curse. Jeff Andretti's devastating leg injuries, Mario Andretti's foot injuries, and Michael Andretti's shocking late-race fuel pump failure collectively amounted to one of the worst examples of bad luck the family ever experienced at Indianapolis. Michael Andretti would not return to Indy for two years, due to his 1993 Formula One participation, and Jeff would qualify only one additional time in his career. A couple years later, family patriarch Mario reflected on the day in his autobiography Andretti. With his youngest son Jeff undergoing surgery, himself recuperating in a hospital bed, and hearing of his other son Michael's heartbreaking loss, the elder Andretti called it the "worst day of my life."

During the summer of 1992, the track would be reconfigured for safety reasons. The apron at the bottom of the track was removed and replaced with a new warm up lane. The outside retaining wall was also replaced. These improvements were completed in time for the 1993 race.

Statistics
The race was held on May 24, only the third time in Indy history the race had fallen on that date. The previous winners on that date had been Bobby Unser (May 24, 1981) and Al Unser, Sr. (May 24, 1987). Al Unser Jr.'s victory on May 24, 1992, marked all three runnings on that date as victories by the Unser family.
Michael Andretti led 160 laps but failed to win the race. It was the most laps led by a non-winner since his father Mario led 170 in a losing effort in the 1987 race.
Polesitter Roberto Guerrero became the third pole winner to finish last. Cliff Woodbury (1929) and Pancho Carter (1985) were the previous two at the time.
Eddie Cheever became the first #2 starter to complete 500 miles since Mario Andretti in 1969. During that period, the second starting position was experiencing a perceived "curse," where it produced no winners, and cars frequently dropping out. In the intervening 22 races, the #1 and #3 starting positions had accounted for 12 victories.
Al Unser, Sr. became the first driver to complete 500 miles in a car powered by a Buick V6 engine.  His third-place finish was the highest finishing position for a Buick powered car since its debut in 1985, and would ultimately be the best finishing position for that engine. 
A record ten former winners representing 20 victories started the race. The ten drivers included:
A. J. Foyt (4 wins)
Al Unser, Sr. (4)
Rick Mears (4)
Gordon Johncock (2)
Mario Andretti (1)
Tom Sneva (1)
Danny Sullivan (1)
Bobby Rahal (1)
Emerson Fittipaldi (1)
Arie Luyendyk (1)
Three-time winner Johnny Rutherford also attempted to qualify, but was too slow. With Al Unser Jr. a first-time winner, the field ultimately comprised 11 winners. In addition, Eddie Cheever and Buddy Lazier would eventually go on to win the race, bringing the winners total to 13 drivers (representing 26 victories) in the 1992 field.

Although A. J. Foyt, Al Unser, Sr., and Rick Mears had competed together for many years, this was the first and only time they took the green flag together as four-time winners.
This was the most recent 500 with two drivers in the field with three or more victories until it was accomplished again in 2013, with both Hélio Castroneves and Dario Franchitti, each with 3 victories apiece.

Broadcasting

Radio

The race was carried live on the IMS Radio Network. Bob Jenkins served as chief announcer for the third year. Derek Daly served as the "driver expert." Daly, who had experience on ESPN, replaced Johnny Rutherford for 1992, but this would be his only appearance on the network. The broadcast was heard on over 600 affiliates.

Bob Forbes conducted the winner's interview in victory lane. It would be the final time until 2004 that a separate interview would be conducted by the radio network crew. In subsequent years, the radio network would simulcast the winner's interview from television.

Other than Daly, the rest of the crew remained the same from 1991. The 1992 race, notable for its windy and cold weather, saw the turn announcers reporting from admittedly uncomfortable locations.

The radio network call of the closest finish in Indy history was critically praised and replayed often. The last seconds of the call were included in a television commercial for Valvoline (Unser Jr.'s sponsor) which ran for several months following the race.

Television
The race was carried live flag-to-flag coverage in the United States on ABC Sports. Paul Page served as host and play-by-play announcer, accompanied by Bobby Unser and Sam Posey. For the second time, Unser served as the pace car driver, and reported live from the pace car on the warm up laps.

The same exact crew from 1990 to 1991 returned. The 1992 broadcast is notable in that it missed the finish of the race. As Al Unser Jr. held off Scott Goodyear at the finish line, the director cut to a camera angle over the flagstand, and viewers were not able to see the leaders actually cross the line until a replay was shown.

Locally, ABC affiliate WRTV arranged to air the race in same-day tape delay in the Indianapolis market. The race is blacked out in Indianapolis, and previously would not be shown locally until a week or two weeks after the race was held.

The broadcast registered a 10.9 rating (34 share) with 37 million viewers, the highest since going to a live broadcast in 1986. The final two hours peaked at 11.8/34.

The broadcast has re-aired numerous times on ESPN Classic since the mid-2000s.

Gallery

Notes

References

Works cited
1992 Indianapolis 500 Day-By-Day Trackside Report For the Media
Indianapolis 500 History: Race & All-Time Stats – Official Site
1992 Indianapolis 500 Radio Broadcast, Indianapolis Motor Speedway Radio Network

External links
 NYTimes:  SPORTS PEOPLE: AUTO RACING; Indy 500's Finish Was Even Closer July 3, 1992
 Video of Michael Andretti's break down with 11 laps to go

Indianapolis 500 races
Indianapolis 500
Indianapolis 500
Indianapolis 500